The 2001 Princeton Tigers football team represented Princeton University in the 2001 NCAA Division I-AA football season. The team was coached by Roger Hughes and played its home games at Princeton Stadium in Princeton, New Jersey. The Tigers tied for fourth in the Ivy League.

Like most of the Ivy League, Princeton played nine games instead of the usual 10, after the school made the decision to cancel its September 15 season opener against Lafayette, following the September 11 attacks.

Schedule

References

Princeton
Princeton Tigers football seasons
Princeton Tigers football